Eberhardt Illmer (30 January 1888 – 26 December 1955) was a German international footballer.

References

1888 births
1955 deaths
Association football goalkeepers
German footballers
Germany international footballers